Instant Coffee is a Canadian artist collective based in Vancouver, and Toronto. Formed in 2000, the collective's membership has undergone a number of changes. Its most active members have included Cecilia Berkovic, Jinhan Ko, Kelly Lycan, Jenifer Papararo, and Khan Lee.

Artistic approach 
Instant Coffee uses the format of the art exhibition as a framework for its practice. Precedents include the 1960s art events known as Happenings, "a performance, event or situation meant to be considered art." As with the Happening, Instant Coffee stages events that "bring artists, writers and musicians together in combinations rarely encountered elsewhere." However, Instant Coffee updates this idea by designating their activities as "service-oriented." The use of corporate-style language is deliberate and is an aspect of the collective’s creation of a strong brand identity. Instant Coffee establishes its brand through the use of a specific graphic style on their website, event invitations, posters, publications and related ephemera. As a further expression of their brand, the collective uses a consistent, self-reflective and ironic, tone in all written communications. For instance, the tagline "Instant Coffee: it doesn't have to be good to be meaningful", plays on the collective’s real world namesake, fake coffee, while promoting their utopian belief in inclusiveness, as opposed to more traditional artworld modes of selection and exclusion.

Like all brands, Instant Coffee has worked hard to ensure certain ideas are associated with its name. The Instant Coffee brand evokes feelings of conviviality; it’s self-aware but fun. This brand identity is the result of collective’s consistent production of art-related events in which the distinction between artwork and audience is blurred. This strong emphasis on the social aspect of art connects Instant Coffee to the broader artworld trend of relational aesthetics. Often an Instant Coffee event consists of works made in a single format that flies below the radar of medium specificity, such as the bumper sticker or stencil, to allow a broad range of artists, and the artistically-inclined, to participate. The Urban Disco Trailer, a retrofitted camping trailer, 
was an early platform used to present artworks in this mode. In more recent projects, the collective has focused on creating a participatory environment for its audience. The Instant Coffee Bass-Bed, contained a subwoofer connected to a sound system that made the bed vibrate. Instant Coffee’s Nooks created four moveable replicas of a kitchen nook, complete with window, inside of which audiences could sit and enjoy a series of art-related events. An ongoing project, the Light Bar reconstructs the gallery as a bar complete with full spectrum light therapy units to fight Seasonal affective disorder.

Instant Coffee listserv 
Artists and art organizations can place notices on one of Instant Coffee’s free email listservs. Current subscribers number at over 8000 on lists operating in Vancouver, Alberta, Toronto, and Halifax.

Public commissions 
 Instant Coffee Disco Fallout Shelter
 A Bright Future
 Nothing Happens in Good Weather
 Perpetual Sunset

References

External links
 Instant Coffee 
 Instant Coffee at Art Metropole 
 Instant Coffee at Henningsen Contemporary
 Instant Coffee at Sparwasser HQ 
 Instant Coffee: Light Bar at the Art Gallery of Greater Victoria
 Instant Coffee at the Vancouver Art Gallery 
 Instant Coffee at the Art Gallery of Ontario 
 Instant Coffee at MKG127

Canadian artist groups and collectives